Yiyang is a county located in the center of the prefecture-level city of Shangrao, in the northeast of Jiangxi province, People's Republic of China. In 1999 it had a population of  inhabitants.

Administrative divisions
In the present, Yiyang County has 1 subdistrict, 9 towns and 5 townships.
1 subdistrict
 Taoyuan

9 towns

5 townships

Climate

Transport 
Yiyang railway station (Jiangxi)

References 

Shangrao
County-level divisions of Jiangxi